Pseudhepomidion is a genus of longhorn beetles of the subfamily Lamiinae.

Species
 Pseudhepomidion albomaculatum Bi, 2020
 Pseudhepomidion assamense Breuning, 1936
 Pseudhepomidion longipenne Bi, 2020
 Pseudhepomidion triangulare (Breuning, 1948)

References

Morimopsini
Cerambycidae genera